Arthur Edward Gilligan (18 October 1879 – 9 July 1963) was an Australian rules footballer who played for the Fitzroy Football Club and Essendon Football Club in the Victorian Football League (VFL).

Notes

External links 
		

1879 births
1963 deaths
Fitzroy Football Club players
Essendon Football Club players
New Zealand players of Australian rules football
People from Palmerston, New Zealand